Rampokan was a traditional Javan big cat fight. Panthers or tigers were released from wooden boxes and surrounded by warriors with lances trying to prevent them from breaking out of the circle. The rampokan would take place towards the end of Ramadan. It symbolized purification and the overcoming of evil. If the tigers and panthers succeeded in breaking through the circle, it was seen as an omen of disaster as famine. The ritual died out in the early 20th century. A battle between a tiger and buffalo was the first part of the event in its earlier incarnations, but in later years this was omitted.

See also
 Javanese people
 Sunda Islands

References

Obsolete blood sports
Javanese culture
Tigers in popular culture
Ramadan
Rituals
Animal cruelty incidents